Novaya Svetlitsa (Viľ Svetlića) is a rural locality (a settlement) and the administrative center of Svetlichanskoye Rural Settlement, Kosinsky District, Perm Krai, Russia. The population was 333 as of 2010. There are 10 streets.

Geography 
Novaya Svetlitsa is located 90 km northeast of Kosa (the district's administrative centre) by road.

References 

Rural localities in Kosinsky District